Jacek Piotr Wojciechowicz (born 26 June 1963 in Racibórz) is a Polish politician. He was elected to the Sejm on 25 September 2005, getting 3380 votes in 19 Warsaw district as a candidate from the Civic Platform list.

He was also a member of Sejm 2001-2005.

See also
Members of Polish Sejm 2005-2007

External links
Jacek Wojciechowicz - parliamentary page - includes declarations of interest, voting record, and transcripts of speeches.

1963 births
Living people
People from Racibórz
Members of the Polish Sejm 2005–2007
Members of the Polish Sejm 2001–2005
Civic Platform politicians